TRNA transglycosylase may refer to:
 TRNA-guanine15 transglycosylase, an enzyme
 Queuine tRNA-ribosyltransferase, an enzyme